Bush Island may refer to:

 Bush Island (Nunavut), in northern Canada
 Bush Island (Nova Scotia), in eastern Canada
 Bush Island, County Down, Northern Ireland; see List of townlands in County Down